Tōjin Okichi may refer to:

 Tōjin Okichi (1930 film), a Japanese silent drama film by Kenji Mizoguchi
 Tōjin Okichi (1954 film), a Japanese drama film by Mitsuo Wakasugi